Khalish is a 2018 Pakistani drama serial directed by Syed Ali Raza Usama, produced by Aijaz Aslam, and written by Imran Ali Safir. The drama stars Faisal Qureshi, Asif Raza Mir and Sunita Marshall as the main leads. The serial premiered on 14 February 2018 until 19 August on Geo Entertainment. It first aired every Wednesday, then Saturday and finally Sunday at 8:00pm .

Cast
Faysal Qureshi As Saahil
Aliya ali As pareesa
Sunita Marshall As Nageen
Kamran Jilani As Feroz
Asif Raza Mir As Altamash
Tanveer Jamal As Ikhlaq
Zainab Qayyum As Mumtaz
Jahanara Hai As Mukhtar Begum
Faraz Farooqui As Bezaad
Sana Humayou As Seemi
Dania Enwer As Rimsha
Fahad Rehmani As Aurangzaib
Tabriz Ali Shah As Rohaan
Salma Shaheen As Pareesa's Mother
Sohail Khan As Ashfaq
Salahuddin Tunio As Jabbar Lakhi
Manoj Kumar As Noman
Amna Malik As Tabinda
Zaheen Tahira As Neelofar's Saas
Ismat Zaidi As Tehmina
Tabbasum Arif As Neelofar
Mariam Mirza As Afshan

Production
Khalish was initially titled as Bewafa but was changed later. This serial marks the return of Bashar Momin, director Syed Ali Raza Usama and Faysal Qureshi. It is produced under the banner of Aijaz Aslam's production house Ice Media & Entertainment.

References

2018 Pakistani television series debuts
Pakistani drama television series
Urdu-language television shows